Bill Rogers (born July 4, 1954) is a politician from Michigan who served in that state's House of Representatives.

Biography 
A Republican from Brighton, he was first elected in 2008, and, due to term limits, was ineligible to seek re-election to the House in 2014.

He is the older brother of Congressman Mike Rogers.

Electoral history

2008

2010

2012

Because of redistricting following the 2010 United States Census, Rogers was redistricted into and ran for the 42nd District.

References

1954 births
People from Brighton, Michigan
Politicians from Lima, Ohio
Republican Party members of the Michigan House of Representatives
Living people
21st-century American politicians